Cayo Espanto is an island off the coast of Belize in the Caribbean Sea. It is one of the approximately 450 islands of the Belize Barrier Reef. Administratively it is part of the Belize District. It is private property.

Until 1997 the island had no name and formed the archipelago of Pinkerton Islands together with two adjacent, tiny islands. In 1997 the island was bought by US-American estate agent Jeff Gram. In December 1998 Gram opened up a resort with seven villas for paying guests. The resort features a helipad, a spa, a gym, and a PADI diving base. Various celebrities have been visiting the island in the past, among them Leonardo di Caprio, who bought nearby Blackadore Caye together with Jeff Gram in order to put up another resort there. In 2022 it was listed among the "20 Best Adults-Only All-Inclusive Resorts in the World" by Reader's Digest magazine.

References

External links 
 Resort website

Private islands of Belize
Uninhabited islands of Belize
Islands of Belize